The following lists events that happened during 1891 in Australia.

Incumbents

Premiers
Premier of New South Wales - Henry Parkes (until 23 October) then George Dibbs
Premier of South Australia - Thomas Playford II
Premier of Queensland - Samuel Griffith
Premier of Tasmania - Philip Fysh
Premier of Western Australia - John Forrest
Premier of Victoria - James Munro

Governors
Governor of New South Wales – Victor Child Villiers, 7th Earl of Jersey  
Governor of Queensland – Henry Wylie Norman 
Governor of South Australia – Algernon Keith-Falconer, 9th Earl of Kintore 
Governor of Tasmania – Robert Hamilton 
Governor of Victoria – John Hope, 1st Marquess of Linlithgow 
Governor of Western Australia – William C. F. Robinson

Events
 5 January - The 1891 Australian shearers' strike begins, which leads to the formation of the Australian Labor Party.
 13 April - Howard Moffat founds newspaper Daily Commercial News, which runs for 108 years before merging with Lloyd's List Australia Weekly to form Lloyd's List DCN.
 17 June - The Labor party first entered the New South Wales Legislative Assembly with 35 members elected.
 9 October - The ceremonial mace is stolen from Victoria's Parliament House, Melbourne.

Arts and literature

Fire's on - Arthur Streeton

Census

Sport
 Malvolio wins the Melbourne Cup

Births
 6 January – Ted McDonald, cricketer (died 1937)
 22 January – Jack Lockett, oldest recorded Australian man (died 2002)
 15 February – Roy Rene, comedian (died 1954)
 9 April – Lesbia Harford, poet (died 1927)
 30 April – Pat O'Hara Wood, tennis player (died 1961)
 26 September – William McKell, Premier of NSW and Governor General of Australia (died 1985)
 25 December (in New Zealand) – Clarrie Grimmett, cricketer (died 1980)

Deaths
 8 May – John Robertson (born 1816), Premier of New South Wales
 27 October – Robert Allwood (born 1803), clergyman
 29 October – Edward Hargraves (born 1816), gold prospector
 7 December – Arthur Blyth (born 1823), Premier of South Australia

References

 
Australia
Years of the 19th century in Australia